Louis Turenne (November 26, 1933 – 25 July 2006) was a Canadian actor.

From 1977 to 1978, he played the role of Anthony Saxon on The Edge of Night.

Turenne was known for his work on the Babylon 5 television series. He played the Minbari Draal in the first season two-part episode "A Voice in the Wilderness". The producers later cast him in the recurring role of Brother Theo, the leader of a group of Catholic monks who came to live on the station. He also played "The Fireside Gourmet" in Mystic Pizza.

External links
 

1933 births
2006 deaths
Canadian male film actors
Canadian male television actors
Male actors from Montreal
French Quebecers
Male actors from Ontario